Gleizé is a commune in the Rhône department in eastern France.

Population

Culture and heritage

Places and monuments 

 Castle of Vaurenard : This is where the Baron de Richemont died.
 Castle Montfleury.
 Castle of Saint-Fonds.

Personalities 

 Baron de Richemont, died in Gleizé August 10, 1853, French crook who pretended to be Louis XVII.
Kevin Joss-Rauze, born in Gleizé, professional basketball player.
Rudy Molard, a French road cyclist, was born there.

See also
Communes of the Rhône department
Rhône-Alpes

References

External links
 mairie-gleize.fr, official website

Communes of Rhône (department)
Beaujolais (province)